Tian Xiangli (born March 1963) is a Chinese politician and the current party branch secretary of the Sichuan Provincial Committee of the Chinese People's Political Consultative Conference, in office since December 2021. She has background in the Communist Youth League. Previously, she was the head of the United Front Department of Sichuan, and a member of its provincial party standing committee, and before that, Communist Party Secretary of Qinhuangdao, a city in Hebei, and the head of the propaganda department of Hebei province.

Early life and education
Tian was born in 1963 in Xingtai, Hebei. She graduated with a degree in Chinese at Hebei Teacher's College (later merged into Hebei North University), graduating in 1984.

Career in Hebei
She then joined the Communist Party of China. She took on local administrative positions in the provincial capital Shijiazhuang before becoming involved with the Communist Youth League organization in the province, serving successively as the Youth League leader in Shijiazhuang, then Hebei province.

In 2003 Tian took on her first major political role as deputy party chief of Tangshan (full department-level rank); she then obtained a graduate degree in management from Tianjin University. In 2005 she was named executive deputy head of the provincial United Front department, then became provincial director of human resources.

In 2008 she was made a vice-chair of the provincial People's Political Consultative Conference. In January 2011 she joined the elite ranks of the provincial Party Standing Committee as provincial United Front chief, then in February 2013 was named party chief of Qinhuangdao. In March 2011 she was selected as the chief supervisor of the elections of the top officers of the Chinese People's Political Consultative Conference. In September 2015, she was named head of the propaganda department of Hebei province.

Career in Sichuan
In December 2017, in her first transfer outside of her home province, she was named head of the United Front Department of Sichuan. In February 2018, she concurrently served as chairwoman of Sichuan Federation of Trade Unions. On 31 December 2021, she was appointed  party branch secretary of the Sichuan Provincial Committee of the Chinese People's Political Consultative Conference, the province's top political advisory body.

References

Living people
People from Xingtai
1963 births
Chinese women in politics
Hebei North University alumni